Rajakumarudu (translated in promotional material as The Prince) is a 1999 Indian Telugu-language romantic comedy film directed by K. Raghavendra Rao. It stars Mahesh Babu and Preity Zinta. The film was produced by C. Aswani Dutt under the Vyjayanthi Movies banner. Krishna made a guest appearance. The music was composed by Mani Sharma. 

Raja Kumarudu is debut film of Mahesh Babu in a lead role after previous roles as a child actor. The film received positive reviews and was commercially successful. The film won two Nandi Awards.

Plot
Raj Kumar goes on a holiday to Khandala and stays with his uncle Dhananjay. He comes across Rani and falls for her. However, he ends up teasing her and she begins to despise him. She is determined to avoid him, but he won't leave her alone. Raj Kumar saves Rani from some thugs, and she is impressed. After spending some time together, she begins to like him and eventually love him.

Unfortunately his uncle has made other plans for him. He reveals the past of the hero's parents and his family. He mentions the challenge that he made with his in-laws to get the hero married to his daughter. Complying to this, the hero informs the heroine that their relationship needs to end there.

Going with his uncle to the village for his uncle's daughter, to his joy he sees that it's none other than Rani.

The rest of the movie revolves around the plot that is woven by him and his uncle to gain the heroine's hand and re-uniting the uncle with his family. This is done in a fun, comical way.

Cast

 Mahesh Babu as Raja
 Preity Zinta as Rani
 Krishna as Krishnamurthy
 Prakash Raj as Dhanunjay
 Jaya Prakash Reddy as Sarvarayudu
 Sumalatha as Rajyalakshmi, Dhanunjay's wife
 Asrani as Mumbai Police Inspector
 Srihari as Narsimharayudu
 Brahmanandam as Hyderabad Police Sub-Inspector Wagle
 M. S. Narayana as Police Constable
 Sajja Teja as Vengalla Rayudu

Soundtrack

Music was composed by Mani Sharma. Music was released on SUPREME Music Company.

Telugu Track-list (Original Version) — Raja Kumarudu

Hindi Track-list (Dubbed Version) — Prince No. 1

Tamil Track-list (Dubbed Version) — Kadhal Vennila

Release
Rajakumarudu released with 78 prints in 116 screens.

Box-office
The film had a 50-day run in 80 centres and a 100-day run in 44 centres. Raja Kumarudu collected a share of 10.51 crore from Andhra Pradesh. It was dubbed in Hindi as Prince No. 1 and in Tamil as Kaadhal Vennila. The film was again dubbed and released theatrically in Tamil during January 2017 as Ivan Oru Thunichalkaran.

Awards
Nandi Awards
Best Home - Viewing Feature film in 1999.
Best Art Director - Srinivasa Raju

References 

1999 films
1990s Telugu-language films
Films directed by K. Raghavendra Rao
Films scored by Mani Sharma
Indian romantic comedy films
1999 romantic comedy films